The Women's Slalom in the 2019 FIS Alpine Skiing World Cup involved 12 events, including three parallel slaloms (one parallel slalom and two city events).  At the end of the season, a new discipline was created for parallel races.  

Two-time defending champion Mikaela Shiffrin from the United States won ten of the twelve races en route to winning an all-time record 17 races during the season (finishing second in the other two); this was Shiffrin's sixth discipline championship in slalom, tying the women's record for career slalom championships set by Vreni Schneider (the men's record is eight, set by Ingemar Stenmark), and she has now won 40 slaloms, tying Stenmark's total in the discipline. Shiffrin scored 1,160 points in the discipline for the season out of a possible 1,200.  Runner-up Petra Vlhová of Slovakia also had an outstanding year with ten podiums (two wins, seven seconds, and a third), but she still finished almost 300 points behind Shiffrin.

The season was interrupted by the 2019 World Ski Championships, which were held from 4–17 February in Åre, Sweden. The women's slalom was held on 16 February.

Standings
 

DNF1 = Did Not Finish run 1
DSQ1 = Disqualified run 1
DNQ = Did not qualify for run 2
DNF2 = Did Not Finish run 2
DSQ2 = Disqualified run 2
DNS = Did Not Start

See also
 2019 Alpine Skiing World Cup – Women's summary rankings
 2019 Alpine Skiing World Cup – Women's Overall
 2019 Alpine Skiing World Cup – Women's Downhill
 2019 Alpine Skiing World Cup – Women's Super-G
 2019 Alpine Skiing World Cup – Women's Giant Slalom
 2019 Alpine Skiing World Cup – Women's Combined

References

External links
 Alpine Skiing at FIS website

Women's Slalom
FIS Alpine Ski World Cup slalom women's discipline titles